Hyalina is a genus of sea snails, marine gastropod mollusks in the subfamily Pruninae of the  family Marginellidae, the margin snails.

Hyalinia Charpentier, 1837 is a junior synonym of Oxychilus Fitzinger, 1833 (family Oxychilidae).

Species
Species within the genus Hyalina include:
 Hyalina albocylindrus Lussi & Smith, 1999
 Hyalina angelquirosi Espinosa & Ortea, 2015
 Hyalina aurorae Espinosa & Ortea, 2015
 Hyalina biancaliviae T. Cossignani & Lorenz, 2020
 Hyalina bonjour Ortea & Espinosa, 2017
 Hyalina brocktoni (Shackleford, 1914)
 Hyalina buskei Espinosa & Ortea, 2013
 Hyalina caribaea Espinosa, Ortea & Diez, 2018
 Hyalina chicoi Espinosa & Ortea, 1999
 Hyalina cotamago Yokoyama, 1922
 Hyalina cubensis Espinosa & Ortea, 1999
 Hyalina cylindrica (G.B. Sowerby II, 1846)
 Hyalina dearmasi Espinosa & Ortea, 2003
 Hyalina discors Roth, 1974
 Hyalina egregia Espinosa, Ortea & Diez, 2017
 Hyalina electrina (G.B. Sowerby III, 1892)
 Hyalina equina Espinosa & Ortea, 2018
 Hyalina fortsaintlouis Ortea & Espinosa, 2017
 Hyalina gibberuliformis Bozzetti, 1997
 Hyalina helena (Thiele, 1925)
 Hyalina jamaiquina Espinosa & Ortea, 2018
 Hyalina keenii (Marrat, 1871)
 Hyalina lucida (Marrat, 1877)
 Hyalina nelsyae Caballer, Espinosa, Ortea & Narciso, 2013
 Hyalina oscaritoi Espinosa, Moro & Ortea, 2011
 Hyalina pallida (Linnaeus, 1758)
 Hyalina perla (Marrat, 1876)
 Hyalina perovula Yokoyama, 1922
 Hyalina redferni Espinosa & Ortea, 2002 - temporary name, Unavailable: type specimens not fixed
 Hyalina sagamiensis Kuroda, Habe & Oyama, 1971
 Hyalina saintjames Ortea & Espinosa, 2016
 Hyalina sowerbyi Turton, 1932
 Hyalina surcaribe Espinosa, Moro & Ortea, 2011
 Hyalina triplicata Boyer, 2017
 Hyalina valentinae T. Cossignani, 2019
 Hyalina vallei Espinosa & Ortea, 2002
Species brought into synonymy
 Hyalina (Volvarina): synonym of Volvarina Hinds, 1844
 Hyalina (Volvarina) mustelina Angas, 1871: synonym of Serrata mustelina (Angas, 1871)
 Hyalina albolineata (d'Orbigny, 1842): synonym of Volvarina albolineata (d'Orbigny, 1842)
 Hyalina avena (Kiener, 1834): synonym of Volvarina avena (Kiener, 1834)
 Hyalina avenacea: synonym of Volvarina avena (Kiener, 1834) (incorrect subsequent spelling of Marginella avena Kiener, 1834)
 Hyalina bojanae A. J. Wagner, 1907: synonym of Morlina glabra nitidissima (Mousson, 1859) (junior synonym)
 Hyalina borroi Espinosa & Ortea, 1998: synonym of Volvarina borroi (Espinosa & Ortea, 1998)
 Hyalina cineracea Dall, 1889: synonym of Prunum cineraceum (Dall, 1889)
 Hyalina dautzenbergi A. J. Wagner, 1907: synonym of Mediterranea planorbis (Möllendorff, 1899) (junior synonym)
 Hyalina deliciosa (Bavay in Dautzenberg, 1912): synonym of Volvarina deliciosa (Bavay in Dautzenberg, 1912)
 Hyalina depressa Sterki, 1880: synonym of Mediterranea depressa (Sterki, 1880) (original combination)
 Hyalina ealesae (Powell, 1958): synonym of Volvarina ealesae (Powell, 1958)
 Hyalina elusiva Dall, 1927: synonym of Prunum torticulum (Dall, 1881)
 Hyalina gracilis C.B. Adams, 1851: synonym of Volvarina gracilis (C.B. Adams, 1851)
 Hyalina heterozona (Jousseaume, 1875): synonym of Volvarina heterozona Jousseaume, 1875
 Hyalina hyalina (Thiele, 1913): synonym of Volvarina hyalina (Thiele, 1912)
 Hyalina lactea (Kiener, 1841): synonym of Volvarina abbreviata (C. B. Adams, 1850)
 Hyalina lentiformis Kobelt, 1882: synonym of Oxychilus lentiformis (Kobelt, 1882) (original combination)
 Hyalina malinowskii L. Pfeiffer, 1865: synonym of Oxychilus deilus (Bourguignat, 1857) (junior synonym)
 Hyalina moolenbeeki Espinosa & Ortea, 2012: synonym of Hyalina pallida (Linnaeus, 1758)
 Hyalina myrmecoon Dall, 1919: synonym of Plesiocystiscus myrmecoon (Dall, 1919) (original combination)
 Hyalina nitens (Michaud, 1831): synonym of Aegopinella nitens (Michaud, 1831)
 Hyalina osoriensis Wollaston, 1878: synonym of Retinella (Lyrodiscus) osoriensis (Wollaston, 1878) represented as Retinella osoriensis (Wollaston, 1878) (original combination)
 Hyalina parvula Locard, 1898: synonym of Volvarina attenuata (Reeve, 1865)
 Hyalina pellucida Schumacher, 1817: synonym of Hyalina pallida (Linnaeus, 1758)
 Hyalina planospira A. J. Wagner, 1907: synonym of Mediterranea planospiroides (A. Riedel, 1969) (homonym; non Hyalina (Euhyalina) planospira Sacco, 1886)
 Hyalina puella Gould, 1861: synonym of Prunum capensis (Krauss, 1848): synonym of Volvarina capensis (Krauss, 1848)
 Hyalina secalina (Philippi, 1844): synonym of Volvarina mitrella (Risso, 1826)
 Hyalina styria: synonym of Volvarina styria (Dall, 1889)
 Hyalina subtriplicata (d'Orbigny, 1842): synonym of Volvarina subtriplicata (d’Orbigny, 1842)
 Hyalina tenuilabra (Tomlin, 1917): synonym of Hyalina pallida (Linnaeus, 1758)
 Hyalina torticulum (Dall, 1881): synonym of Prunum torticulum (Dall, 1881)
 Hyalina veliei (Pilsbry, 1896): synonym of Prunum succinea (Conrad, 1846)
 Hyalina warrenii (Marrat, 1876): synonym of Volvarina warrenii (Marrat, 1876)

References

 Eugene V. Coan & Barry Roth , Status of the genus Hyalina Schumacher, 1817  (Mollusca, Gastropoda), J. Moll. Stud. (1976) 42, p.  217-222
 Espinosa J. & Ortea J. (1998) Nuevo género y nueva especie de Molusco Gasterópodo maginelliforme (Mollusca: Gastropoda) con rádula taenioglossa. Avicennia 8-9: 113-116
 Cossignani T. (2006). Marginellidae & Cystiscidae of the World. L'Informatore Piceno. 408pp
 Fehse D. (2012) Caribeginella Espinosa & Ortea 1998 eine Gattung der Trivioidea (Mollusca: Gastropoda: Littorinimorpha)? Conchylia 42(1-4): 49–50.

External links

Marginellidae
Monotypic gastropod genera